People awarded the Honorary citizenship of the City of Seoul, South Korea are:

Honorary citizens of Seoul
Listed by date of award:

"As of 2019, there are now a total of 823 Honorary Citizens."

References

Seoul

Honorary Citizens
South Korean awards